Covetous Creature is a remix EP by Jack Off Jill released in 1998.

Track listing 
 "American Made" (Tweaker Remix Chris Vrenna) - 3.25
 "My Cat" (Meow Mix) - 5.46
 "Poor Impulse" (No Control Mix) - 4.41
 "Girlscout" (Sunday Mix - Susan Wallace of Switchblade Symphony with Enemies) - 3.53
 "Cumdumpster" (Delusional Cannibal Mix Agent Moulder) - 3.07
 "My Cat" (Automatic Speed Mix- Shai De La Luna  of Lords of Acid) - 4.56
 "Poor Impulse Control"  (750 degrees of separation mix Morphic Field) - 4.27

Extra tracks (found at the end of track 7):
 "American Made" (extra metal Tweaker mix) - Starts at approx. 5.25/Ends at approx. 10.39
 "Covet" (The Clarice Starling mix) (Put The Lotion In The Basket by Jessicka & Howard Melnick) - Starts at approx. 12.30

Personnel 
 Jessicka
 Robin Moulder
 Claudia Rossi
 Ivan de Prume (Former White Zombie drummer)
 Scott Putesky (Former lead guitarist of  Marilyn Manson and the Spooky Kids)

References 

Jack Off Jill albums
1998 EPs
1998 remix albums
Remix EPs